Lamphun railway station is a railway station in the Nai Mueang Subdistrict, Mueang Lamphun District, Lamphun Province, Thailand. It is the main railway station of the province and is owned by the State Railway of Thailand (SRT). To the south of the railway station is a metal railway bridge crossing the River Kuang.

Train services 
 Special Express "Uttrawithi" 9/10 Bangkok-Chiang Mai-Bangkok
 Special Express 7/8 Bangkok-Chiang Mai-Bangkok
 Special Express 13/14 Bangkok-Chiang Mai-Bangkok
 Express 51/52 Bangkok-Chiang Mai-Bangkok
 Rapid 109/102 Bangkok-Chiang Mai-Bangkok
 Local 407/408 Nakhon Sawan-Chiang Mai-Nakhon Sawan

References
 
 

Railway stations in Thailand